Mark Stuart Grew (born 15 February 1958) is an English former football player and coach who played as a goalkeeper.

His career started in 1976 with West Bromwich Albion, where he spent seven seasons as a back-up keeper before moving on to Leicester City. After just a year with the "Foxes" he moved on to Ipswich Town. In 1986, he signed for Port Vale, where he became the first choice goalkeeper. He spent six years at Vale Park, making almost 200 the Football League appearances, twice winning the club's Player of the Year award and playing in the 1989 Third Division play-off victory. He transferred to Cardiff City in 1992, and won the Third Division title with the club in 1992–93, and also picked up two Welsh Cup winners medals. His final club was Hednesford Town, whom he signed for in 1994, and left in 1995. Over the years he also enjoyed short loan spells with Wigan Athletic, Oldham Athletic, Fulham, and Blackburn Rovers.

He remained in the game after retirement as a player, spending eight years as a coach at Port Vale before his sacking in 2002. He quickly returned to his coaching position at the club though, and remains a key member of the backroom staff. He has had three separate spells as caretaker-manager at the club.

Playing career

Early career
Grew grew up in Bilston, where he attended the goalkeeping academy ran by legendary Wolverhampton Wanderers goalkeeper Bert Williams after accepting that he "was probably too fat and lazy to play outfield". He turned professional at First Division club West Bromwich Albion in the 1976–77 season, having just starred in the 1976 FA Youth Cup final, which ended in a 5–0 aggregate victory over Wolverhampton Wanderers. During the 1978–79 campaigned he was loaned out to Fourth Division newcomers Wigan Athletic, where he played four league games in the absence of John Brown. He returned to The Hawthorns, and played 33 league games for the "Baggies" as he faced competition from Tony Godden, before he joined Leicester City, also of the First Division, for a £60,000 fee. He played five top-flight games for Gordon Milne's "Foxes" in the absence of Mark Wallington during the 1983–84 season. He also played five Second Division games on loan at Oldham Athletic, before he moved to First Division club Ipswich Town on a £60,000 transfer in March 1984. He spent two seasons with the "Tractor Boys", but played just six league games. He also played four Second Division games on loan at Fulham in 1985, and returned to West Brom on loan in 1986 to play one game.

Port Vale
In June 1986, he joined Third Division Port Vale; aged 28 years old, he was looking for first team football. His debut for the club came in a 2–2 draw against Middlesbrough at Victoria Park, who were at the time close to folding. After he sustained an injury in the game, he suffered from damaged knee ligaments for much of the 1986–87 season. However Alex Williams retired from back injury in September 1987. As Grew took the #1 jersey he never looked back and played fifty games in 1987–88.

Grew was then voted the club's Player of the Year for his performances over his 49 games in 1988–89. He played both legs of Vale's play-off Final victory over Bristol Rovers, conceding just the one goal. He played 51 games in 1989–90, as Vale retained their Second Division status.

However, he lost his place to Trevor Wood in August 1990. In October, he went on to enjoy a successful two-month loan spell with league rivals Blackburn Rovers, who had Terry Gennoe injured and Darren Collier out of form, playing thirteen league games. He won his first team spot back at Vale in February 1991, and played fourteen games for the "Valiants" in 1990–91. He became the club's Player of the Year once more in 1992 for his ever-presence in the 53 game 1991–92 season. However, he left on a free transfer for Cardiff City in May 1992.

Later career
He was between the posts for Cardiff City when they beat Manchester City 1–0 in the FA Cup Fourth Round on 29 January 1994. He became an "instant hero" with the Cardiff supporters after saving a penalty from Keith Curle. He joined non-League side Hednesford Town in 1994 after leaving Cardiff and made one appearance during the 1994–95 season.

Style of play
He was a shot-stopping goalkeeper, who mostly remained on his line and relied on his defenders to deal with crosses.

Coaching career
Grew was appointed the Port Vale youth coach in December 1994 and stayed with the club for the next eight years. He was appointed assistant manager under Brian Horton in 1999, until he was sacked in December 2002 by the club's administrators. In March 2003 he was appointed as assistant manager at Stafford Rangers, until he returned to Port Vale in a coaching capacity for the youth-team, after the club was taken over by Valiant 2001. Following a capitulation to Leyton Orient at Brisbane Road on 20 October 2007, Grew gave a memorable post-match interview, saying that the team was "gutless... spineless... the worst bunch of players I have seen at Vale Park in 17 years". On 8 October 2008, Grew rejected the opportunity to become assistant to recently appointed Port Vale manager Dean Glover.

In December 2010, he was made joint caretaker manager at Vale, along with Geoff Horsfield, following the departure of Micky Adams. Vale were hammered 5–0 by Rotherham United in his first game in charge, but rallied to beat Burton Albion 2–1, before Jim Gannon was appointed manager. During Adams' reign Grew had doubled up as a first team coach, but when Gannon arrived at the club Grew chose to focus solely on his role as youth team coach. Following Gannon's swift departure in March 2011, Grew was elevated to the position of caretaker-manager for the third time in twelve years. Assisted by Horsfield, Marc Richards told the press that "it's absolutely brilliant that Grewy and Geoff are in charge again". After his first match back in charge ended in a 1–1 draw, Grew stated that if offered the job first time he would "seriously consider it". Defeat to bottom club Stockport County all but ended the club's promotion campaign, as well as Grew's hopes of a permanent appointment. He slammed both his players and the directors, claiming that "I was never in the picture to become the next manager".

Upon Adams' return as manager he reshuffled the club's coaching set-up, and in July 2011 Grew was made assistant manager. In July 2014 his role changed to that of goalkeeping coach and scouting co-ordinator. He left the club in May 2015 as part of new manager's Rob Page's reshuffle of his backroom staff, and decided to take time out of football to undergo a back operation. He left the club following his testimonial game to honour his 25 years of service to the club.

Personal life
Grew's daughter, Melissa (born 1992), is a model.

Career statistics

Managerial statistics

Honours

as a player
Individual
Port Vale F.C. Player of the Year: 1989 & 1992

West Bromwich Albion
FA Youth Cup: 1976

Port Vale
Football League Third Division play-offs: 1989

Cardiff City
Football League Third Division: 1992–93
Welsh Cup: 1992, 1993; runner-up: 1994

References

1958 births
Living people
People from Bilston
Association football goalkeepers
English footballers
West Bromwich Albion F.C. players
Wigan Athletic F.C. players
Notts County F.C. players
Leicester City F.C. players
Oldham Athletic A.F.C. players
Derby County F.C. players
Ipswich Town F.C. players
Fulham F.C. players
Port Vale F.C. players
Blackburn Rovers F.C. players
Cardiff City F.C. players
Hednesford Town F.C. players
English Football League players
Southern Football League players
English football managers
Port Vale F.C. managers
English Football League managers
Association football coaches
Association football goalkeeping coaches
Association football scouts
Port Vale F.C. non-playing staff